Pultenaea ericifolia is a species of flowering plant in the family Fabaceae and is endemic to the south-west of Western Australia. It is an erect or scrambling shrub with down-curved, cylindrical, grooved leaves and yellow to orange and red flowers.

Description
The are bracteoles at the base of the sepals. Flowering occurs from September to October and the fruit is a pod.

Taxonomy and naming
Pultenaea ericifolia was first formally described in 1839 by John Lindley in A Sketch of the Vegetation of the Swan River Colony from an unpublished description by George Bentham. The specific epithet (ericifolia) means "Erica-leaved".

Distribution
This pultenaea is widespread in the south-west of Western Australia.

Conservation status
Pultenaea ericifolia is classified as "not threatened" by the Government of Western Australia Department of Parks and Wildlife.

References

ericifolia
Eudicots of Western Australia
Plants described in 1839
Taxa named by John Lindley